Countess Johanna Magdalene of Hanau-Lichtenberg (18 December 1660, Bischofsheim am Hohen Steg – 21 August 1715, Hanau) was a daughter of Johann Reinhard II of Hanau-Lichtenberg (1628–1666) and the Countess Palatine Anna Magdalena of Birkenfeld-Bischweiler (1640–1693).

She died on 21 August 1715 and is said to have been buried in the St. Mary's Church in Hanau.

Marriage and issue 
On 5 December 1685 Johanna Magdalena married Count John Charles August of Leiningen-Dagsburg (born: 17 March 1662; died: 3 November 1698).  They had the following children:

 Anna Dorothea Charlotte (born: 11 August 1687; died young)
 Alexandrine Catherine (born: 21 August 1688; died: November 1708)
 Sophie Magdalena (born: 14 April 1691; died: 18 March 1727)
 married on 1 September 1723 Wild- and Rhinegrave John Charles Louis (born: 20 June 1686 at Rheingrafenstein Castle; died: 21 October 1740), son of Count Frederick William of Salm-Grumbach (1644–1706) and his wife Countess Louise of Leiningen (1654–1723)
 Marie Christine Felicizitas (born: 29 December 1692; died: 3 June 1734 in Eisenach)
 married on 4 December 1711 Prince Christopher of Baden-Durlach (born: 9 October 1684 at Karlsburg Castle in Durlach; died: 2 May 1723 in Karlsruhe), son of the Margrave Frederick VII Magnus of Baden-Durlach (1647–1709) and his wife Princess Augusta Maria of Schleswig-Holstein-Gottorp (1649–1728)
 married on 29 May 1727 at Philippsruhe Castle in Hanau-Kesselstadt to Duke John William III of Saxe-Eisenach (born: 17 October 1666 in Friedewald; died: 14 January 1729 in Eisenach), son of the Duke John George I of Saxe-Eisenach (1634–1686) and his wife Countess Johanetta of Sayn-Wittgenstein (1626–1701)
 William Christian Reinhard (born: 30 September 1693 at Broich Castle; died: 1 December 1693, ibid)
 Christian Karl Reinhard (born: 7 July 1695 at Broich Castle; died: 17 November 1766 in Heidesheim am Rhein)
 married on 27 November 1726 in Mettenheim with Katharina Polyxena of Solms-Rödelheim (born: 40 January 1702 in Rödelheim; died: 29 March 1765 in Heidenheim), daughter of Count Louis of Solms-Rödelheim (1664–1716) and his wife Countess Charlotte Sibylle of Ahlefeldt-Rixinger (1672–1716). In 1698, he succeeded his father as ruler of Leiningen-Dagsburg.
 John Louis William (born: 5 April 1697 at Broich Castle; died: November 1742)
 married around 1730 to Sofie Eleonore (born: 1710 in Dagsburg; died: 19 June 1768), daughter of Count  Leopold Emich of Leiningen (1685–1719) and his wife Countess Charlotte Amalie of Leiningen (1682–1729)

Ancestry

References 
 Detlev Schwennicke: Europäische Stammtafeln: Stammtafeln zur Geschichte der Europäischen Staaten.
 Reinhard Suchier: Genealogie des Hanauer Grafenhauses, in: Festschrift des Hanauer Geschichtsvereins zu seiner fünfzigjährigen Jubelfeier am 27. August 1894, Hanau, 1894
 Reinhard Suchier: Die Grabmonumente und Särge der in Hanau bestatteten Personen aus den Häusern Hanau und Hessen, in: Programm des Königlichen Gymnasiums zu Hanau, Hanau, 1879, p. 1-56
 Ernst J. Zimmermann: Hanau Stadt und Land, 3rd ed., Hanau, 1919, reprinted 1978

Footnotes 

1660 births
1715 deaths
17th-century German people
17th-century German women
18th-century German people
18th-century German women
German countesses
House of Hanau
Leiningen family
People from the Margraviate of Baden